The  are privately-run schools marketed to students who are taking examinations held each year in Japan from January to March to determine college admissions. The students generally graduated from high school but failed to enter the school of their choice. The test, unlike the French baccalauréat and the South Korean College Scholastic Ability Test, has different versions, with different schools looking for results from different exams. In Japan, the test is generally considered the most important event in a child's education. Students who fail may spend a year or more studying to retake the examination. They are colloquially referred to as rōnin. Yobiko are similar to juku except for differences such as curriculum, legal status, and the main type of students who attend.

Legal status
They are for-profit private corporations that are officially listed as schools by Japan's Ministry of Education, Culture, Sports, Science and Technology. At the municipal level, they are supervised by boards of education. Even so, they are subject to little supervision, as compliance with regulations for physical conditions what is mainly checked, and curriculum and teacher salaries are not inspected.

Types
Yobikō mainly differ by the number of enrolled students. The most numerous are those for each city, and each has less than 500 students. National yobikō, called mammoth yobikō, have 10,000 students or more. Some also prepare students to pass specialized entrance exams such as those for medical and art schools and have less than 100 students and typically charge higher tuition than other types.

Structure

Curriculum
Designed to prepare students to pass college entrance exams, the curriculum had memorization of facts and learning of exam-taking skills. A study of a typical yobikō found that the curriculum consisted of studying questions that were on previous exams, specific ways to improve answers, and specific subject topics that would be covered in the exam.

Personnel
The teaching personnel is variety of teachers, mostly employed and casual part-time teachers such as retired teachers and teachers affiliated with another school. A few are regular full-time teachers.

Students
The lines between the age groups of students that attend yobikō are becoming blurred. Junior high school students and high school seniors are known to attend after their regular school hours and on Sundays  but most students are rōnin, high school graduates who have failed the college entrance exam and are preparing to take it again. As rōnin students, they attend yobikō classes full-time.

Monitoring
The quality of teaching is observed and evaluated by methods such as cameras in classrooms and a survey related to the quality of teachers' performances that students take.

Mock exams
Students take mock exams throughout the year. Scores are made public so students are able to compare their scores with the scores of other students to find their academic standing. Based on their scores, students know whether they can meet the required entrance test scores required by the college to which they plan to apply.

Attendance and popularity
Family spending on private higher education is as common as that for public higher education. The OECD reported that in 2013, private spending accounted for about 66 percent of higher education costs and about 80 percent of that amount came from households (p. 2-3).

One of the most well-known yobikō is the Kawaii Juku. Although it is considered a juku, among the courses it offers are classes specifically for entrance exam preparation, giving it a yobikō-like characteristic. It appeals not only to rōnin students but also to a wide range of age groups, as classes are offered to students from elementary school to college (Kawaijuku Group, 2012).

Advantages
Japan’s low juvenile crime rate may be caused in part because children who attend yobikō or juku, in addition to regular school, have less free time.

Yobiko could improve students' chances of being accepting to a higher-quality college. Also, in general, rōnin who attend higher-quality colleges earn more income (Ono, 2007, p. 282).

Disadvantages
The yobikō is not equally accessible to students. A national survey and a survey on the Hiroshima branch of a yobikō, which could be considered a typical one, found that more males attend yobikō than females. One reason is that a female rōnin  is frowned upon in Japanese society. Also, not all students are able to afford to attend one.

The strain on family income created by the expenses of sending children to yobikō or juku may be contributing to the declining birth rate in Japan.

See also 
Cram school
Juku
History of education in Japan
Education in Japan
University-preparatory school
Jaesusaeng
Sundai Preparatory School

References

Kawaijuku Group. (2012). Details about our businesses. Retrieved from http://www.kawaijuku.jp/en/education/college/detail.html#college02
OCED. (n.d.). Education at a glance 2013: Country note for Japan. Retrieved from OCED url; http://www.oecd.org/japan/educationataglance2013-countrynotesandkeyfacttables.htm 

Tsukada, M. (1988b). The yobiko, the institutionalized supplementary educational institution in Japan: A study of the social stratification process (Doctoral dissertation). Retrieved from http://hdl.handle.net/10125/10289

Academic pressure in East Asian culture
Education in Japan
Japanese words and phrases
School types
Testing and exams in Japan